is a railway station in Kōtō, Tokyo, Japan. Its station number is T-15. The station opened on 29 March 1969, and consists of an island platform.

Lines
 Tokyo Metro Tōzai Line

Station layout

History 
Minami-sunamachi Station opened on 29 March 1969.

The station facilities were inherited by Tokyo Metro after the privatization of the Teito Rapid Transit Authority (TRTA) in 2004.

References

External links

Tokyo Metro station information

Stations of Tokyo Metro
Tokyo Metro Tozai Line
Railway stations in Tokyo
Railway stations in Japan opened in 1969